Platonove is a village located in the Podilsk Raion of Odesa Oblast, Ukraine. Platonov has 37 inhabitants (2001) and the village has an area of 0.028 km².

Platonove is located in the southwestern part of Ukraine, close to the Moldovan border, and has an international border crossing near the village. The Highway M13, which is part of the European route E584, runs through the village.

History 
Platonove was founded in 1840.

Until 18 July 2020 Platonove was located in Okny Raion. The raion was abolished that day as part of the administrative reform of Ukraine, which reduced the number of raions of Odesa Oblast to seven.  The area of Okny Raion was merged into Podilsk Raion.

References

Villages in Podilsk Raion